Edwardsville is an unincorporated community in Warren County, in the U.S. state of Ohio. Edwardsville is the oldest community in Harlan Township.

History
Edwardsville was laid out in 1824 by Edward Thomas, and named for him. A post office called Edwardsville was established in 1825, and remained in operation until 1901.

References

Unincorporated communities in Warren County, Ohio
Unincorporated communities in Ohio